The girls' 1500 metres speed skating competition of the 2016 Winter Youth Olympics was held at Hamar Olympic Hall on 15 February 2016.

Results
The races were held at 10:30.

References 

Girls' 1500m